Oliva mustelina virgata is a subspecies of the sea snail species Oliva mustelina, a marine gastropod mollusk in the family Olividae, the olives.

References

mustelina virgata